Employees Provident Fund or Employees' Provident Fund refer to:

 Employees' Provident Fund Organisation, in India
 Employees Provident Fund (Malaysia)
 Employees Provident Fund Nepal
 Employees' Provident Fund (Sri Lanka)